Soul Sanctuary Gospel Choir is a London-based gospel choir which aims to make gospel music more accessible beyond its traditional home in the Pentecostal church, and particularly into Anglican and Catholic churches.

In pursuit of this goal, the choir became a charitable incorporated organisation in January 2018 providing a "high-quality gospel choir that composes, rehearses and performs gospel music in a range of venues and contexts. Through various initiatives and resources, it is also a major provider of education for the public in the creation and performance of gospel music."

The choir sings regularly at church services at St James's Church, Piccadilly and at Farm Street Church in Mayfair and has a facility whereby it can share its rehearsal audio files thereby enabling other churches to explore gospel music.

Recordings 

 With All Your Soul (2013)
 Silent Night (2017)
 You Are The Key (2018)

Notable Appearances 

 The Resurrection (The Jazz Cafe, 2015 & 2018)
  Red Wednesday - Aid to the Church in Need (2016, 2017)
 HMP Wandsworth (Easter 2018)
Anniversary of Grenfell Tragedy (2018)
 Greenbelt (2017, 2018)
 Lost and Found (Adoremus Festival, Liverpool, 2018)
Church of England "Follow The Star" Advert (2019)
A Night to Remember (with Mica Paris) at St Edmundsbury Cathedral
'The Prayer' - virtual choir video made during the coronavirus lockdown (2020)
'Rise Within Us - The Coming of the Spirit' recording celebrating Pentecost, dedicated to the staff and prisoners of HMP Wandsworth, released 31 May 2020 
'Keep Our Doors Open' Fundraising Concert for St Martin-in-the-Fields, 31 May 2020
Recording of 'Lean on Me' to commemorate third anniversary of Grenfell Tower Fire.

BBC Recordings 

 'Easter Glory', BBC Radio 2,  Maida Vale Studios, Easter Sunday 2015
 'Sunday Worship' BBC Radio 4, St James's Church, Piccadilly 2015
 'At the foot of the Cross', BBC Radio 2,  Maida Vale Studios, Good Friday 2016
 'Sunday Worship', BBC Radio 4, Maida Vale Studios, Christmas 2016
 'Sunday Worship', BBC Radio 4, St Martin in the Fields, Christmas 2017
 'Daily Service', BBC Radio 4, Maida Vale Studios, Summer 2018
'Get Up and Flee- The Flight to Egypt', BBC Radio 4
'At the foot of the Cross', BBC Radio 2, Maida Vale Studios, Good Friday 2020 (pre-recorded)

TV Appearances 
In 2019, the choir appeared in the second of a two part TV documentary, 'Britain's Easter Story' which was presented by Gareth Malone and Karen Gibson.  The 5 minute segment of the documentary showed the choir in rehearsal at Farm Street Church followed by a performance in church.  The choir performed excerpts from 'The Resurrection' a selection of contemporary gospel songs, which tell the story of Jesus's resurrection.

References

External links 

Choir website

British gospel music groups
London choirs